Fructosephosphates are sugar phosphates based upon fructose, and are common in the biochemistry of cells.

Fructosephosphates play integral roles in many metabolic pathways, particularly glycolysis, gluconeogenesis and the pentose phosphate pathway.

The major biologically active fructosephosphates are:
Fructose 1-phosphate
Fructose 2-phosphate
Fructose 3-phosphate
Fructose 6-phosphate
Fructose 1,6-bisphosphate
Fructose 2,6-bisphosphate

See also
 Fructose bisphosphatase

References

External links
 
 Pubchem - fructose-6-phosphate

Organophosphates